Halolaelapidae is a family of mites in the order Mesostigmata.

Species
This family contains the following genera and species:

Dinychella Berlese, 1888
 Dinychella asperata Berlese, 1888
Halodarcia Karg, 1969
 Halodarcia incideta Karg, 1969
 Halodarcia porolata Karg, 1969
Halolaelaps Berlese & Trouessart, 1889
 Halolaelaps aeronautus (Vitzthum, 1920)
 Halolaelaps areolatus (Leitner, 1946)
 Halolaelaps balticus Willmann, 1957
 Halolaelaps celticus Halbert, 1915
 Halolaelaps communis (Gotz, 1952)
 Halolaelaps coulsoni Gwiazdowicz & Teodorowicz, 2017
 Halolaelaps coxalis Willmann, 1957
 Halolaelaps curvisetosus (Leitner, 1946)
 Halolaelaps euxinus Trach 2016
 Halolaelaps fallax (Gotz, 1952)
 Halolaelaps holsaticus Vitzthum, 1931
 Halolaelaps incisus Hyatt, 1956
 Halolaelaps leitnerae (Gotz, 1952)
 Halolaelaps leptoscutatus Karg, 1971
 Halolaelaps marinus (Brady, 1875)
 Halolaelaps nodosus Berlese & Trouessart, 1889
 Halolaelaps octoclavatus (Vitzthum, 1920)
 Halolaelaps porulus (Gotz, 1952)
 Halolaelaps quadricavatus (Gotz, 1952)
 Halolaelaps remanei Willmann, 1952
 Halolaelaps saproincisus Hirschmann, 1966
 Halolaelaps sculpturatus Sellnick, 1940
 Halolaelaps sexclavatus (Oudemans, 1902)
 Halolaelaps simplex Willmann, 1957
 Halolaelaps soemermaai (Karg, 1965)
 Halolaelaps strenzkei (Gotz, 1952)
 Halolaelaps subtilis (Leitner, 1946)
 Halolaelaps suecicus Sellnick, 1957
 Halolaelaps tuerkorum (Gotz, 1952)
 Halolaelaps vicinus (Gotz, 1952)
Halozercon Wisniewski, Karg & Hirschmann, 1992
 Halozercon barguzin Marchenko, 2018
 Halozercon capitaneus Marchenko, 2019
 Halozercon karacholana Wisniewski et al., 1992
 Halozercon kazachok Marchenko, 2019
 Halozercon tigerek Marchenko, 2019
Leitneria Evans, 1957
 Leitneria granulata (Halbert, 1923)
 Leitneria pugio (Karg, 1961)
Saprolaelaps Leitner, 1946
 Saprolaelaps bacchusi Hyatt, 1956
 Saprolaelaps punctulatus Leitner, 1946
Saprosecans Karg, 1964
 Saprosecans baloghi Karg, 1964
 Saprosecans bialoviensis Gwiazdowicz, 2001

References

Mesostigmata
Acari families